"What's on Tonight" is the third and final single released from Montell Jordan's second album, More.... The song was produced and written by both Jordan and Jodeci's DeVante Swing and became the third consecutive top 40 single from the album. It peaked at 21 on the Billboard Hot 100 and was certified gold on May 22, 1997 for sales of over 500,000 copies.

Single track listing

A-Side
"What's on Tonight" (LP Version)- 3:59  
"What's on Tonight" (T.V. Track)- 3:55

B-Side
"Superlover Man" (LP Version)- 3:35  
"Superlover Man" (T.V. Track)- 3:35

Charts and certifications

Weekly charts

Year-end charts

Certifications

|}

References

1997 singles
Montell Jordan songs
Song recordings produced by DeVante Swing
Songs written by DeVante Swing
Songs written by Montell Jordan
1996 songs
Def Jam Recordings singles